Blas Avena (June 30, 1983 – May 4, 2016) was an American mixed martial artist. A professional competitor from 2005 until 2016, Avena competed for the WEC and Bellator. Known for his exciting fighting style, none of his 16 career bouts made it to a decision.

Mixed martial arts career

Early career
Avena relocated from Southern California to Las Vegas in 2004 to work as a security guard for the Hard Rock Hotel & Casino and later made his professional MMA debut in 2005. Avena compiled an overall record of 3-0 before being signed by the WEC.

World Extreme Cagefighting
Avena made his promotional debut at WEC 25 against Logan Clark on January 20, 2007. Avena lost via TKO in the third round.

After the loss at WEC 25, Avena decided to drop down to the welterweight division and faced Tiki Ghosn on August 5, 2007 at WEC 29. Avena won via rear-naked choke submission in the first round. Avena followed this up with another first-round submission win over Joe Benoit at WEC 30 before dropping his next fight against Hiromitsu Miura at WEC 33 on March 26, 2008 via first-round knockout.

Avena made his next appearance at WEC 35 against Dave Terrel on August 3, 2008 and won via first-round TKO. Avena then faced Jesse Lennox on January 25, 2009 at WEC 38. Avena was defeated via second-round knockout and subsequently released from the promotion.

Bellator MMA
After his release from the WEC, Avena went 1-3 with one no contest before being signed by Bellator. Avena made his promotional debut against Lenny Lovato February 28, 2013 at Bellator 91 and won via first-round knockout.

Avena then faced War Machine at Bellator 96 on June 19, 2013. Avena was defeated via first-round TKO.

Death
On the morning of May 4, 2016, Avena's body was discovered by police in his Las Vegas apartment. A cause of death was not immediately disclosed, however it was being investigated as a suicide.

Mixed martial arts record

|-
| Loss
| align=center| 8–7 (1)
| War Machine
| TKO (punches)
| Bellator 96
| 
| align=center| 1
| align=center| 3:55
| Thackerville, Oklahoma, United States
| 
|-
| Win
| align=center| 8–6 (1)
| Lenny Lovato
| TKO (punch)
| Bellator 91
| 
| align=center| 1
| align=center| 1:40
| Rio Rancho, New Mexico, United States
| 
|-
| Loss
| align=center| 7–6 (1)
| Brock Jardine
| TKO (punches)
| Showdown Fights: Uprising
| 
| align=center| 2
| align=center| 2:31
| Orem, Utah, United States
| 
|-
| NC
| align=center| 7–5 (1)
| Shawn Fitzsimmons
| No Contest
| Superior Cage Combat 3
| 
| align=center| 2
| align=center| 3:42
| Las Vegas, Nevada, United States
|Catchweight (173 lbs); Avena missed weight.
|-
| Loss
| align=center| 7–5
| Josh Neer
| TKO (punches & elbows)
| Superior Cage Combat 2
| 
| align=center| 1
| align=center| 2:54
| Las Vegas, Nevada, United States
| 
|-
| Win
| align=center| 7–4
| Kenny Marzola
| Submission (rear-naked choke)
| MMA Xplosion: Super Fight Night
| 
| align=center| 1
| align=center| 1:34
| Las Vegas, Nevada, United States
| 
|-
| Loss
| align=center| 6–4
| Dave Hulett
| TKO (punches) 
| MMA Xplosion: Gunderson vs. Sharp
| 
| align=center| 1
| align=center| 3:08
| Las Vegas, Nevada, United States
| 
|-
| Loss
| align=center| 6–3
| Jesse Lennox
| KO (knee and punches) 
| WEC 38
| 
| align=center| 2
| align=center| 0:41
| San Diego, California, United States
| 
|-
| Win
| align=center| 6–2
| Dave Terrel
| TKO (punches) 
| WEC 35
| 
| align=center| 1
| align=center| 1:07
| Las Vegas, Nevada, United States
| 
|-
| Loss
| align=center| 5–2
| Hiromitsu Miura
| KO (punches) 
| WEC 33
| 
| align=center| 1
| align=center| 2:35
| Las Vegas, Nevada, United States
| 
|-
| Win
| align=center| 5–1
| Joe Benoit
| Submission (guillotine choke) 
| WEC 30
| 
| align=center| 1
| align=center| 0:29
| Las Vegas, Nevada, United States
| 
|-
| Win
| align=center| 4–1
| Tiki Ghosn
| Submission (rear-naked choke) 
| WEC 29
| 
| align=center| 1
| align=center| 1:01
| Las Vegas, Nevada, United States
|Return to Welterweight.
|-
| Loss
| align=center| 3–1
| Logan Clark
| TKO (elbows)  	
| WEC 25
| 
| align=center| 3
| align=center| 4:23
| Las Vegas, Nevada, United States
|Middleweight debut.
|-
| Win
| align=center| 3–0
| Brandon Melendez
| Submission (guillotine choke)
| UCE: Round 16: Finals 
| 
| align=center| 2
| align=center| N/A
| Salt Lake City, Utah, United States
| 
|-
| Win
| align=center| 2–0
| Jake Paul	
| Submission (guillotine choke)
| UCE: Round 14: Finals 
| 
| align=center| 1
| align=center| 2:59
| West Valley City, Utah, United States
| 
|-
| Win
| align=center| 1–0
| Benjamin Garcia 
| Submission (guillotine choke) 
| UCE: Round 13: Episode 3
| 
| align=center| 1
| align=center| 0:18
| Sandy, Utah, United States
|

References

External links

www.BlasAvena.com
www.wec.tv/BlasAvena
Blas 'The Dispile' Avena

1983 births
2016 deaths
American male mixed martial artists
Mixed martial artists from California
Welterweight mixed martial artists
Mixed martial artists utilizing Brazilian jiu-jitsu
American mixed martial artists of Mexican descent
Bodyguards
American practitioners of Brazilian jiu-jitsu
People awarded a black belt in Brazilian jiu-jitsu